Greta Molander (23 August 1908 – 20 March 2002) was a Swedish/Norwegian rally driver and writer. She was born in Ystad, and grew up in Nyköping and Stockholm. She married in 1938, and the couple settled in Sandefjord. She started in her first rally in 1929. Her Monte Carlo Rally debut came in 1933, and she won the Coupes des Dames in 1937 and in 1952. She competed in the first European Rally Championship in 1953, where she won the women's class. She published several books from her travel expeditions, in the United States, Mexico, the African continent, and China.

References

Further reading 
 

1908 births
2002 deaths
People from Ystad Municipality
Swedish rally drivers
Norwegian rally drivers
Norwegian travel writers
Norwegian women non-fiction writers
People from Ystad
Sportspeople from Skåne County